Ludmilla Ruoso is a French actress who is active in dubbing.

Filmography

Films

Television

TV series

Television films

Dubbing

Films

Feature films

Animated feature films

Television

Television films

Television series

References

External links

 
Ludmila Ruoso on RS Doublage.com 

French actresses
French voice actresses
Date of birth unknown
Place of birth unknown
Living people
Year of birth missing (living people)